The 2018 Kazakhstan Cup is the 27th season of the Kazakhstan Cup, the annual nationwide football cup competition of Kazakhstan since the independence of the country.

Participating clubs 
The following 21 teams qualified for the competition:

Group stages

Group A

Group B

Group C

Group D

Last 16

Quarterfinal

Semifinals
The four winners from the quarterfinals were drawn into two two-legged ties.

Final

Scorers

4 goals:

 Bauyrzhan Islamkhan, Kairat
 Nurlan Dairov, Okzhetpes

3 goals:

 Ihar Zyankovich, Atyrau
 Yelmar Nabiev, Makhtaaral

2 goals:

 Aliyar Muhamed, Akademiya Ontustik
 Dauren Kaykibasov, Altai Semey
 Alexei Shakir, Altai Semey
 Konstantin Zarechniy, Altai Semey
 Soltan Zhandos, Altai Semey
 Magamed Uzdenov, Caspiy
 Geysar Alakbarzadeh, Ekibastuz
 Carlos Fonseca, Irtysh Pavlodar
 Kuanysh Begalin, Makhtaaral
 Sanat Zhumakhanov, Okzhetpes
 Vitali Li, Ordabasy
 Mardan Tolebek, Ordabasy
 Daniyar Nukebai, FC Ruzaevka

1 goals:

 Alexander Balaev, Ak-Bet
 Argen Manekeev, Akademiya Ontustik
 Farukh Mirsalimbayev, Akademiya Ontustik
 Shyngys Samenov, Akademiya Ontustik
 Nurzhan Uais, Akademiya Ontustik
 Oleg Ovchinnikov, Altai Semey
 Altynbek Tuleyev, Altai Semey
 Vladislav Prokopenko, Astana
 Marat Khairullin, Atyrau
 Novica Maksimović, Atyrau
 Predrag Sikimić, Atyrau
 Lawrence Elemesov, Caspiy
 Samit Chulagov, CSKA Almaty
 Dauren Suyunov, CSKA Almaty
 Kasymzhan Taipov, CSKA Almaty
 Evgeniy Mosin, Ekibastuz
 Madiyar Raimbek, Ekibastuz
 Ilya Sotnik, Ekibastuz
 Ilya Kalinin, Irtysh Pavlodar
 Madiyar Ramazanov, Irtysh Pavlodar
 Vladimir Vomenko, Irtysh Pavlodar
 Gbolahan Salami, Irtysh Pavlodar
 Akmal Bakhtiyarov, Kairat
 Islambek Kuat, Kairat
 Magomed Paragulgov, Kairat
 Vyacheslav Shvyrev, Kairat
 Aleksandr Sokolenko, Kairat
 Yan Vorogovskiy, Kairat
 Franck Dja Djédjé, Kaisar
 Valeri Korobkin, Kaisar
 Toktar Zhangylyshbay, Kaisar
 Maxim Filcakov, Kyran
 Donis Ismailov, Kyran
 Unknown, Kyran
 Unknown, Kyran
 Askar Abutov, Makhtaaral
 Oleg Pasechenko, Makhtaaral
 Roman Pavinic, Makhtaaral
 Geysar Alekperzade, Makhtaaral
 Askar Abutsov, Makhtaaral
 Elmar Nabiev, Makhtaaral
 Rinat Abdulin, Okzhetpes
 Kazbek Geteriev, Okzhetpes
 Anton Kuksin, Okzhetpes
 Viktor Kryukov, Okzhetpes
 Artem Kasyanov, Okzhetpes
 Kairat Ashirbekov, Ordabasy
 Jaba Jighauri, Ordabasy
 Nursultan Zhaksylyk, Osdyussor Zhas Ulan
 Ravil Saurambaev, FC Ruzaevka
 Unknown, SDYuShOR 8
 Unknown, SDYuShOR 8
 Unknown, SDYuShOR 8
 Unknown, SDYuShOR 8
 Egon Vůch, Shakhter Karagandy
 Sergei Shaff, Shakhter Karagandy
 Damir Kojašević, Shakhter Karagandy
 Tanat Nusserbayev, Tobol
 Bauyrzhan Turysbek, Tobol
 Timur Baizhanov, Taraz
 Duman Tursunbay, Taraz
 Ilya Vorotnikov, Taraz
 Predrag Govedarica, Taraz

Own goal

 Kenzhebek Zhasulan, Osdyussor Zhas Ulan (vs Akademiya Ontustik)
 Nursultan Alibekova, Ak-Bet (vs Altai Semey)
 Magamed Uzdenov, Caspiy (vs Kyran)
 Aybol Abiken, Kairat (vs Ordabasy)

References

External links 
 

2018
Cup
2018 domestic association football cups